Magnolia EP is the debut EP from the Christian singer-songwriter Ellie Holcomb. The EP released on August 23, 2011, by Drew Holcomb. This EP received commercial successes.

Background
The EP released on August 23, 2011, by Drew Holcomb, and this was her first EP.

Commercial performance
For the Billboard charting week of September 10, 2011, Magnolia EP was the No. 16 most sold album on the Christian Albums chart, and it was the No. 9 most sold album on the breaking-and-entry chart of the Heatseekers Albums. In addition, the album was the No. 48 most sold of the Independent Albums.

Track listing

Chart performance

References

2011 EPs
Ellie Holcomb albums